Hip Hop Therapy (HHT) is a contemporary approach in mental health treatment that takes into account the profound impact of Hip Hop culture and its capacity to promote individual and communal transformation. Dr. Edgar Tyson (1963-2018) coined the term and created the foundational model in 1996, and Hip Hop therapy has evolved into a conceptual framework with significant global resonance. HHT refers to the purposeful use of Hip Hop culture by a mental health professional within the context of the therapeutic relationship. The approach embodies a wide array of interventions that mix the inherently cathartic components of the culture with well-established treatment models, from music therapy, poetry therapy and other expressive therapies to cognitive behavioral therapy and narrative therapy. Hip Hop therapy is a culturally relevant remix of therapeutic conceptions that revitalizes the many merits of established forms that have traditionally overlooked disenfranchised populations.

Origins
Hip Hop therapy is rooted in the social work tradition as a strengths-based, culturally competent framework focused on fitting the model to the client. Although Hip Hop has always been therapeutic for the communities that have produced it, Dr. Edgar Tyson developed the approach in attempts to systematically integrate the culture into mental health settings. In the mid-1990s, as a clinical social worker in a residential facility for homeless and justice-involved youth in Miami-Dade county, Tyson was inspired to incorporate Hip Hop into individual and group therapy sessions. Upon witnessing the results, he decided to formally study the model's implementation, which would later be expounded upon in his pioneering scholarly article in 2002.

After conducting his initial study in 1997, Tyson presented his model at the 30th Annual Conference of the National Association of Black Social Workers in 1998.  Tyson (1998) would also present that year at the 20th Annual Symposium for the Association for the Advancement of Social Work with Groups, which would serve as a guide for Ciardiello's (2003) implementation of HHT, where the therapeutic act of creating different aspects of the culture was introduced to the literature base. According to Tyson (2002), the most significant finding of his exploratory study was that most of the youth expressed the desire to create their own songs to share and discuss in group, which he would then go on to facilitate.  Ciardiello (2003) effectively built off of this implication for further research, as have several others since.

Although Tyson's (2002) initial intervention focused primarily on Hip Hop music, he emphasized that it "must be understood as one component and within the larger context of the hip hop culture," which he referred to as the "central mechanism of HHT" (p. 134). Built within his founding model is the understanding that the music is but one artifact of a much larger culture and therefore cannot be analyzed in isolation. This is a key distinction that separates HHT from other rap music interventions, such as Elligan's (2000) Rap Therapy model. Thus, Hip Hop therapy represents the prospective inclusion of each cultural facet into the therapeutic process.  Hip Hop therapy is also a "source of empowerment to counteract the negative impact of hip-hop music on African American women" through their creation of lyrics or discussions around existing music. Robinson et al. has called for more research studies to be done to study the effects of Hip Hop-based intervention programs for improving health literacy, health behavior, or mental health for children. Despite showing significant promise, research studies have been limited.

Prevention 
According to HIV prevention specialists Carla Boutin-Foster et al. Hip Hop can be used as a tool for HIV prevention in adolescents through an innovative  school-based (RHAP) program that uses hip- hop and rap music to raise awareness among high school youth about HIV/AIDS. Half of public school teens have admitted to being sexually active whereas 63% wear protection, making those who do not in danger of a sexually transmitted disease. The RHAP program was implemented into regular school hours through analyzing lyrical content of rap songs and discussing how it affects their views and habits. Students were asked feedback on their thoughts on the program. Students in the program reported that after the program they had a better understanding of the content of the music and how it relates to behaviors that increase the risk of HIV/AIDS.

Clinicians and social work practitioners advocate using culturally sensitive Hip Hop-based interventions among urban African American substance-using youth to increase retention in prevention programs and successful cessation of drugs. Findings show that Hip Hop therapy is an effective tool for clinicians to use, "not only to build rapport but to give their clients a voice.” Social workers are integrating rap based music intervention in social work practice with youth, particularly African-American and Latino youth "to insulate youths from the plethora of pitfalls that occur during adolescence."

Global use 
A European-based music program called COOL helps young and disadvantaged youth in Scotland. This program works with youth in low-income households, or who have experienced abuse or trauma and encourages them to open up through music, especially Hip Hop. The program helps youth gain confidence in themselves, take part in productive activities, attend school, and overall it offers support to improve their mental well-being.

References 

Psychotherapies
Hip hop